Olga Pilipenko (born January 4, 1966, Oryol) is a Russian political figure and a deputy of the 7th and 8th State Dumas. In 1998, she was granted a Candidate of Sciences in Technical sciences degree. 

After graduating from the university, Pilipenko started working at the Oryol's branch of the Moscow State University of Instrument Engineering and Computer Science (since 1993 – Oryol State Technical University). She headed the department for more than 25 years. In 2009, Pilipenko became a professor. From 2013 to 2015, she worked as a dean of the State University - educational-scientific-industrial complex. In 2015, she was appointed dean of the Prioksky State University. On September 13, 2015, she was elected deputy of the Oryol City Council of People's Deputies of the 5th convocation. On May 26, 2019, she was elected dean of the Oryol State University. On September 8, 2019, she was elected deputy of the 7th State Duma from the Oryol constituency. In 2021, she was re-elected for the 8th State Duma.

References

1966 births
Living people
United Russia politicians
21st-century Russian politicians
Eighth convocation members of the State Duma (Russian Federation)
Seventh convocation members of the State Duma (Russian Federation)